Sven Gustav Thorell (18 February 1888 – 29 April 1974) was a Swedish sailor who competed in the mixed one-person dinghy event at the 1928 and 1932 Summer Olympics. He won the gold medal in 1928 and finished ninth in 1932. In 1933–34 Thorell was president of the Swedish Canoe Federation.

References

1888 births
1974 deaths
Swedish male sailors (sport)
Olympic sailors of Sweden
Sailors at the 1928 Summer Olympics – 12' Dinghy
Sailors at the 1932 Summer Olympics – Snowbird
Olympic gold medalists for Sweden
Olympic medalists in sailing
Stockholms Segelsällskap sailors
Medalists at the 1928 Summer Olympics
Sportspeople from Stockholm